Other People's Relatives is a 1956 Soviet drama film directed by Mikhail Schweitzer and based on the story Not to the court by Vladimir Tendryakov.

Plot 
The plot — the conflict between the Komsomol, advanced collective farmer Fyodor and his young wife's parents, ardent opponents of the collective farm. A young woman caught between two fires: passionately loved one and family. Not daring to contradict the parent's will, she at first did not find the strength to leave behind her husband from home.

Cast 
 Nikolai Rybnikov as Fyodor Gavrilovich Soloveikov
 Nonna Mordyukova as Stesha Ryashkina
 Nikolai Sergeyev as Silanty Petrovich Ryashkin
 Aleksandra Denisova as Alevtina Ryashkina
 Yelena Maksimova as Varvara Stepanovna
 Stepan Krylov as Miron
 Lyubov Malinovskaya as Pelagia, the wife of Miron
 Maya Zabulis as Tosya
 Leonid Kmit as Fedot
 Vladimir Gulyaev as Subbotin
 Yuri Soloviev as Pyotr Chizhov
 Gennadi Yukhtin as Vasya, accordion
 Elena Volskaya as Glazycheva

In episodes
 Leonid Bykov as teacher Lev Zakharovich
 Georgiy Zhzhonov as guest on the wedding

References

External links 
 
 

Soviet black-and-white films
Films directed by Mikhail Shveytser
Lenfilm films
Soviet drama films
1956 drama films